The Cambridge Neuropsychological Test Automated Battery (CANTAB), originally developed at the University of Cambridge in the 1980s but now provided in a commercial capacity by Cambridge Cognition, is a computer-based cognitive assessment system consisting of a battery of neuropsychological tests, administered to subjects using a touch screen computer. The CANTAB tests were co-invented by Professor Trevor Robbins and Professor Barbara Sahakian. The 25 tests in CANTAB examine various areas of cognitive function, including:
 general memory and learning, 
 working memory and executive function, 
 visual memory, 
 attention and reaction time (RT), 
 semantic/verbal memory,  
 decision making and response control.

The CANTAB combines the accuracy and rigour of computerised psychological testing whilst retaining the wide range of ability measures demanded of a neuropsychological battery. It is suitable for young and old subjects, and aims to be culture and language independent through the use of non-verbal stimuli in the majority of the tests.

The CANTAB PAL touchscreen test, which assesses visual memory and new learning, received the highest rating of world-leading 4* grade from the Research Excellence Framework (REF) 2014. CANTAB and CANTAB PAL were highlighted in the Medical Schools Council ‘Health of the Nation’ 2015 publication.

See also
 Cognitive test
 Computer-based assessment

References

External links 
 Cambridge Cognition - Official Website
 CANTAB Corporate Health

Neuropsychological tests